"Kamikaze" is a song by Danish singer-songwriter MØ produced for her second studio album, Forever Neverland, but was only included on the Japanese release of the album. The song is another collaboration between MØ and Diplo of Major Lazer and was also co-produced by Jr Blender and Boaz van de Beatz. "Kamikaze" was released through Sony Music Entertainment and premiered on BBC Radio 1 on 14 October 2015 at 7:30 PM BST at Annie Mac. It was released worldwide on 15 October. It has also reached the top 40 in Belgium and Denmark.

Background
The antecedent draft of "Kamikaze" was authored by MØ's confidante Mads Kristiansen in April 2015. MØ says she "fell in love" with the song instantly, and immediately set about making it her own. MØ then hooked up with American producer Diplo in New York City, working on versions of the song. In a press release MØ praised the creative energy and affection she contributed with Diplo and also analyzed working with him.
 
The official audio later premiered on 14 October, on MØ's Vevo channel.

In popular culture
The song was sampled in the feature film Nerve and is included in the film's soundtrack. It also is featured in episode 1x17 of the American television series Quantico and in the movie Snatched.

Music video
The accompanying music video for "Kamikaze" was filmed in Kyiv, Ukraine. It  was also shot and directed by Truman & Cooper and produced by Amalia Rawlings and Corin Taylor. It premiered on MØ's Vevo channel on 27 October. Billboard magazine likened the video of "drag-racing motor bikes and riding around on what appears to be a chariot made of an old sofa and a tractor" to scenes from Mad Max: Fury Road. The music video was included in Pigeons & Planes' "Best Music Videos of the Month". The music video also gained 1 million views in its initial three days.

Reception
"Kamikaze" was premiered by Annie Mac as "The Hottest Record of the Year". The song also came in at #60 on the annual Triple J Hottest 100 for 2015.

Charts

Certifications

Release history

References

MØ songs
2015 songs
Songs written by Diplo
Song recordings produced by Diplo
Songs written by MØ
Music videos shot in Ukraine
Songs written by Jr Blender
Songs written by Boaz van de Beatz